Amphiprion fuscocaudatus (the Seychelles anemonefish) is a marine fish belonging to the family Pomacentridae, the clownfishes and damselfishes.

Characteristics of Anemonefish 

Clownfish or anemonefish are fishes  that, in the wild, form symbiotic mutualisms with sea anemones and are unaffected by the stinging tentacles of the host anemone, see .  The sea anemone protects the clownfish from predators, as well as providing food through the scraps left from the anemone's meals and occasional dead anemone tentacles. In return, the clownfish defends the anemone from its predators, and parasites. Clownfish are small-sized, and depending on species, they are overall yellow, orange, or a reddish or blackish color, and many show white bars or patches. Within species there may be color variations, most commonly according to distribution, but also based on sex, age and host anemone.  Clownfish are found in warmer waters of the Indian and Pacific oceans and the Red Sea in sheltered reefs or in shallow lagoons.

In a group of clownfish, there is a strict dominance hierarchy. The largest and most aggressive fish is female and is found at the top. Only two clownfish, a male and a female, in a group reproduce through external fertilization. Clownfish are sequential hermaphrodites, meaning that they develop into males first, and when they mature, they become females.

Description
The body of A. fuscocaudatus is dark brown to blackish, with the white bars and yellow or orange snout, breast, belly, pelvic and anal fins. The caudal fin has a dark central area and longitudinal streaks separated with lighter areas. They have 11 dorsal spines, 2 anal spines,  15-16 dorsal soft rays and 14 anal soft rays.

Color variations
None known.

Similar species
A. chrysogaster is very similar however its caudal fin is uniformly dark with just a narrow white margin.

Distribution and Habitat
A. fuscocaudatus is found only in the Seychelles Islands and Aldabra in the western Indian Ocean.

Host anemones
A. fuscocaudatus is associated with the following species of anemone:

Stichodactyla mertensii Mertens' carpet sea anemone

References

External links

 
 

Pomacentridae
fuscocaudatus
Fish described in 1972